Ramularia necator is a fungal plant pathogen infecting coconut palms.

References

Fungal plant pathogens and diseases
Coconut palm diseases
necator